Adinolfi is an Italian surname of Germanic origin. Notable people with the surname include:

 Al Adinolfi (1934–2019), American politician
 Edgardo Adinolfi (born 1974), Uruguayan footballer
 Gabriele Adinolfi (born 1954), Italian neo-fascist
 Gaetano Adinolfi, Deputy Secretary General of the Council of Europe
 Isabella Adinolfi (born 1978), Italian politician
 Mario Adinolfi (born 1971), Italian journalist

References